William White (13 October 1936 – 7 December 2000) was an English footballer.

Playing career
White joined Burnley from the Liverpool based Clubmoor Boys' Club in 1954, going on to score four times in his nine league outings for the Clarets. His spell included six appearances during 1959–60, when Burnley were champions of the Football League First Division.

In March 1961 he moved to Wrexham, but four months later he switched to local rivals Chester. The following year he joined Halifax Town but he did not make any more appearances in The Football League.

After the end of his football career, White ran a newsagent shop in Liverpool with his wife Winifred. He died in Ormskirk District General Hospital in December 2000 after contracting MRSA. Burnley flew their flag at half-mast as a mark of respect following his death.

External links
Burnley career details

References

1936 births
2000 deaths
Footballers from Liverpool
English Football League players
English footballers
Association football forwards
Burnley F.C. players
Wrexham A.F.C. players
Chester City F.C. players
Halifax Town A.F.C. players
Deaths from methicillin-resistant Staphylococcus aureus